Macteola interrupta is a species of sea snail, a marine gastropod mollusc in the family Mangeliidae.

Description
The length of the shell attains 12 mm.

The shell is nodose at the shoulder. It shows strong, narrow, rounded ribs descending from the nodules. Its color is whitish, with hair-like, chocolate, revolving lines between the ribs, sometimes approximating into bands.

Distribution
This marine species occurs off Queensland, Australia, the Kermadec Islands, New Zealand, the Loyalty Islands and the Philippines; also off New Caledonia and Mauritius.

References

 Cernohorsky, W.O. 1978. Tropical Pacific Marine Shells. Sydney : Pacific Publications 352 pp., 68 pls.
 Brook, F.J., Marshall, B.A. 1998: The coastal molluscan fauna of the northern Kermadec Islands, southwest Pacific Ocean, Journal of the Royal Society of New Zealand, 28
 Liu, J.Y. [Ruiyu] (ed.). (2008). Checklist of marine biota of China seas. China Science Press. 1267 pp
 Spencer, H.G., Marshall, B.A. & Willan, R.C. (2009). Checklist of New Zealand living Mollusca. Pp 196-219. in: Gordon, D.P. (ed.) New Zealand inventory of biodiversity. Volume one. Kingdom Animalia: Radiata, Lophotrochozoa, Deuterostomia. Canterbury University Press, Christchurch

External links
 Reeve, L.A. 1846. Monograph of the genus Mangelia. pls 1-8 in Reeve, L.A. (ed). Conchologia Iconica. London : L. Reeve & Co. Vol. 3
 Duclos P.L. (1846-1850). Colombella. In J.C. Chenu, Illustrations conchyliologiques ou description et figures de toutes les coquilles connues vivantes et fossiles, classées suivant le système de Lamarck modifié d'après les progrès de la science et comprenant les genres nouveaux et les espèces récemment découvertes. Volume 4
 Pease W.H. (1860). Descriptions of new species of mollusca from the Sandwich Islands. Proceedings of the Zoological Society of London. 28: 18-36; 141-148
 Deshayes, G. P. (1863). Catalogue des mollusques de l'île de la Réunion (Bourbon). Pp. 1-144. In Maillard, L. (Ed.) Notes sur l'Ile de la Réunion. Dentu, Paris.
  Tucker, J.K. 2004 Catalog of recent and fossil turrids (Mollusca: Gastropoda). Zootaxa 682:1-1295.
 
  Tucker, J.K. 2004 Catalog of recent and fossil turrids (Mollusca: Gastropoda). Zootaxa 682:1-1295.
  Spencer H.G., Willan R.C., Marshall B.A. & Murray T.J. (2011). Checklist of the Recent Mollusca Recorded from the New Zealand Exclusive Economic Zone
  Hedley, C. 1922. A revision of the Australian Turridae. Records of the Australian Museum 13(6): 213-359, pls 42-56 

interrupta
Gastropods described in 1846